The Saint Paul Chamber Orchestra (SPCO) is a full-time professional chamber orchestra based in Saint Paul, Minnesota. In collaboration with five Artistic Partners, the orchestra's musicians present more than 130 concerts and educational programs each year in over 14 venues throughout the Minneapolis/St. Paul area. They are regularly heard on American Public Media's nationally syndicated radio programs "Performance Today" and SymphonyCast.  

The orchestra's recording of Aaron Copland's Appalachian Spring at Sound 80 studios was one of the earliest digital audio recordings to see commercial release.

Beginning with the 2004–05 season, the SPCO adopted a new artistic model by eliminating the position of music director and creating positions for several Artistic Partners, prominent established musicians. Under this model the SPCO musicians have a much higher degree of artistic control.

Launched in 1995, the SPCO's CONNECT education program reaches 6,000 students annually in 16 Minneapolis and Saint Paul Public Schools. The orchestra's activities are supported by the Friends of the Saint Paul Chamber Orchestra.

Artistic partners
Joshua Bell (2004–07)
Stephen Prutsman (2004–07)
Nicholas McGegan (2004–09)
Pierre-Laurent Aimard (2006–09)
Douglas Boyd (2003–09)
Dawn Upshaw (2007–13)
Edo de Waart (2010–14)
Roberto Abbado (2005–15)
Christian Zacharias (2009–16)
Thomas Zehetmair (2010–17)
Jeremy Denk (2014–present)
Patricia Kopatchinskaja (2014–present)
Martin Fröst (2014–present)
Pekka Kuusisto (2016–present)
Jonathan Cohen (2016–present)

Artistic leadership
Leopold Sipe (Music Director, 1959–71)
Dennis Russell Davies (Music Director, 1972–80)
Pinchas Zukerman (Music Director, 1980–87)
Stanisław Skrowaczewski (Interim Music Advisor, 1987–88)
Christopher Hogwood (Music Director, 1988–92)
Hugh Wolff (Principal Conductor, 1988–92; Music Director, 1992–2000)
Bobby McFerrin (Creative Chair, 1994–99)
Andreas Delfs (Music Director, 2001–04)
Kyu-Young Kim (Artistic Director, 2016–present)

Awards and recognitions
Grammy Award for Best Chamber Music Performance: Dennis Russell Davies (conductor) & The Saint Paul Chamber Orchestra for Copland: Appalachian Spring (1980)
ASCAP awards for Programming of Contemporary Music, including 2011 and 2014

2012-2013 lockout

In October 2012, after months of negotiations between orchestra musicians and management, the SPCO locked out its union musicians. Six months later, musicians approved a three-year labor agreement that cut their pay by $15,000 per year, reduced the SPCO from 34 to 28 players and offered buyouts to musicians 55 years and older.

See also
Bill McGlaughlin
Compositions by Bill McGlaughlin
Friends of the Saint Paul Chamber Orchestra

Notes

References
Kenney, Dave. 50 Years of Music: The Saint Paul Chamber Orchestra. Nodin Press, 2009.

External links
The Saint Paul Chamber Orchestra
Musicians of SPCO

Orchestras based in Minnesota
Chamber orchestras
Arts organizations based in Saint Paul, Minnesota
Culture of Saint Paul, Minnesota
Musical groups established in 1959
1959 establishments in Minnesota